Sustainable art is art in harmony with the key principles of sustainability, which include ecology, social justice, non-violence and grassroots democracy.
Sustainable art may also be understood as art that is produced with consideration for the wider impact of the work and its reception in relationship to its environments (social, economic, biophysical, historical and cultural).

History 
According to the contemporary art historians and curators Maja and Reuben Fowkes, the origins of sustainable art can be traced to the conceptual art of the late 1960s and early 1970s, with its stress on dematerialisation and questioning of the functioning of the art system. They also connect the rise of the concept of sustainability to the ending of the Cold War in 1989 and the emergence of a new awareness of the global character of ecological and social problems. Sustainable art adopts, according to these authors, a critical position towards some key practitioners in the land art movement of the 1960s, who showed little concern for the environmental consequences of treating the landscape like a giant canvas with a bulldozer for a brush. They have questioned the polemical division between 'autonomous' and 'instrumental' art originating with modernism, arguing that it is 'autonomy that gives art, as well as artists as social actors, the potential to be free and able to offer alternatives to dominant ideological paradigms.'

Since 2005 there is a Sustainable Arts Biennale running at Ihlienworth near Hamburg, Germany, curated by the German conceptional artist and curator Samuel J. Fleiner.
There are a range of interpretations over the relations between art and sustainability, besides the term 'sustainable art' promoted by Maja and Reuben Fowkes: Other authors prefer the broader notions of 'sustainability arts' or 'art and sustainability' (e.g. Sacha Kagan and Volker Kirchberg. Still others explicitly rejected the use of the term 'sustainable art', referring instead to 'artistic work that inspires us to think about sustainability" (Margot Käßmann).

Professional discussion of the relationship of contemporary art to notions of sustainability blossomed across Europe in the early years 2000, with e.g. the conference of the German Society for Political Culture (Instituts für Kulturpolitik der Kulturpolitischen Gesellschaft e.V.), in January 2002 at the Art Academy of Berlin, and the 'Tutzinger Manifest'. An International Symposium on Sustainability and Contemporary Art took place at Central European University, in Budapest (Hungary) in March 2006. This was the first in a series of international symposia organised by Maja and Reuben Fowkes bringing together contemporary artists, philosophers, environmental sciences and activists to explore common ground around issues such as 'Exit or Activism' (2008), 'Hard Realities and the New Materiality' (2009) and 'Art, Post-Fordism and Eco-Critique' (2010).. In March–April 2007 at the Leuphana University Lüneburg, the Arts Research Network of the European Sociological Association focused its attention on the recent movements and approaches to 'arts and sustainability' at its biennial conference.

Key texts in the emerging field of sustainable art include 'Kultur - Kunst - Nachhaltigkeit' (2002) by Hildegard Kurt and Bernd Wagner, ‘The Principles of Sustainability in Contemporary Art’ (2006) by Maja and Reuben Fowkes  and 'Art and Sustainability' (2011) by Sacha Kagan. A  collection of interdisciplinary analyses of the arts and cultures with relationship to sustainability is available in 'Sustainability: a new frontier for the arts and cultures' (2008) edited by Sacha Kagan and Volker Kirchberg.

Exhibitions devoted explicitly to "sustainable art" include e.g. ‘Beyond Green: Towards a Sustainable Art’ at the Smart Museum in Chicago in November 2005. For an analysis of the conflictual politics of sustainability and the ambiguity of the term sustainability (which oscillates between "ecological sustainability" and "economic sustainable development," see TJ Demos, “The Politics of Sustainability: Art and Ecology” (2009). For a recent account of the multi-faceted role of contemporary art in highlighting environmental issues, expressing criticism towards unsustainable factors in society, and offering imaginative solutions for the achievement of sustainability, see Maja and Reuben Fowkes's essay on 'Art and Sustainability' in Enough for All Forever (2012).

Modern Sustainable Artists  
Modern sustainable artists include artists who are using non-toxic, sustainable materials in their art practices as well as integrating conceptual ideas of sustainability into their work.
Washington, DC based glass sculptors Erwin Timmers  and Alison Sigethy incorporate some of the least recycled building materials; structural glass.

See also 
Land art
Systems art
Sustainable design

References

External links 
Center for Art Education and Sustainability (CAES)
Art Exploration and Development
ecoartspace
Green Museum
Cultura21: international network for cultures of sustainability
Arts & Ecology
Sustainability and Contemporary Art
New Frontiers in Arts Sociology: 2007 ESA Arts Conference
The Center for Sustainable Practice in the Arts
Final report of the 2007 conference of The ESA (European Sociological Association) Arts Research Network

Environmental art
Visual arts genres
Art